The Association football competition at the 2010 Central American and Caribbean Games were set to start 21 July, although qualification took take place beforehand. All participants had to be born on or after 1 January 1989. On 13 July 2010 the organizing committee for the games (Comaz) announced that the event would not be held because CONCACAF had threatened to sanction countries that participated.

Preliminary round

The Preliminary Round was contested by some CONCACAF teams that determined the qualified teams to the 2010 Central American and Caribbean Games. Six teams were drawn into three match ups that were contested in a two-legged tie. The first leg of each of the preliminary round match ups was played on 21 March 2010, and the second leg was played on 27–28 March. Costa Rica did not participate in the first part, being the strongest team, they got an automatic spot into an extra playoff series against the best losing team of the two-legged series. Nicaragua, having the best result, played against Costa Rica. All seven Central American associations took part of the qualifying process.

|-
!colspan=7|Extra Playoff
|-

|}

Matches

First legs

Second legs 

 Panama won 3–0 on aggregate.

 El Salvador won 1–0 on aggregate.

 Belize 2–2 Nicaragua on aggregate. Belize won on away goals.

Playoff

 Costa Rica won 12–1 on aggregate.

Statistics

Goalscorers

Final tournament

Venues

CONCACAF controversy
On 6 July 2010, ten days before the games started, CONCACAF withdrew their support of the tournament stating that the tournament facilities allegedly do not meet the "minimum standards required to conduct an international tournament." They did not announce or inform this directly to the organizing committee, instead it was through the Costa Rica Football Federation's Web Page. A few weeks before this announcement Concacaf officials had visited the installations and given them praise.

More than $750,000 was invested in preparing the Pista Atletica Relín Sosa and the Estadio de Aguada by Administración del Financiamiento para la Infraestructura and the Municipalities of Aguada and Cabo Rojo. Concacaf inspectors had gone to Puerto Rico in April and noted that there were some problems with the Aguada Stadium. In response AFI invested $500,000: it was painted, new grass was installed and other improvements were made. The officials also mentioned deficiencies in the dressing rooms, and the Cabo Rojo government invested $250,000.

At first the Mayagüez 2010 organizing committee intended to hold the football events, with or without Concacaf. Felipe Perez, president of the Organizing Committee and Hector Cardona, president of Odecabe, were going to travel to Trinidad and Tobago to meet with Jack Warner, president of Concacaf on 9 July 2010.  Yet the meeting was canceled since the Concacaf stated that their decision was final. The Organizing Committee offered various options including moving some of the games to the Juan Ramón Loubriel Stadium and asked the Concacaf to reconsider its position, to no avail.

On 13 July 2010 Felipe Perez announced that the event would not be held because CONCACAF had threatened to sanction countries that participated.  Some of the possible sanctions were the teams accreditation by Concacaf and ending economic helps.  Comaz never received any written or official indication from Concacaf about the non-celebration of the games.  Felipe Perez stated that Comaz would take their complaint to FIFA. He also stated that the Puerto Rico national football team would participate in the opening ceremony with the Puerto Rico delegation.

More than 4,000 tickets had already been sold for the events. On 14 July 2010 Felipe Perez announced to the press that Comaz was evaluating with their legal counsel the possibility of suing Concacaf in the next couple of days.

Women's event

Squads

Results

Table 
The table is compiled by awarding 3 points for a victory, one point for a draw, and no points for a loss.

Winners

References

External links
 

Events at the 2010 Central American and Caribbean Games
2010
CEn
Sports in Mayagüez, Puerto Rico